Ismaïl Yıldırım (born 1 June 1990) is a Dutch professional footballer who currently plays as a winger for VV Capelle in the Dutch Vierde Divisie. He formerly played for Boluspor, Kozakken Boys, RKC Waalwijk, and ASWH.

Football career 
Yıldırım played in the youth academy of FC Dordrecht, after being scouted at the local DFC. 

In 2011, the right winger moved to Kozakken Boys, where he would play for three years. In 2014 he was taken over by RKC Waalwijk. He made his debut for Waalwijk on 8 August 2014, when he lost 3–2 to the peer relegated club, Roda JC. Yıldırım was replaced nine minutes before time by Philippe van Arnhem. In March 2015, the winger extended his contract with RKC for one season and an option for another year. 

In the summer of 2016, Yıldırım made the move to Turkish Boluspor, where he signed a two-year contract. In February 2017, his contract was terminated. In June 2017, he signed a one-year contract with Menemen Belediyespor, yet in August of that year he joined ASWH. At the end of the 2019–20 season, he announced his intention to leave the club. A month later he decided to continue playing at ASWH. In the summer of 2021, Yildirim left ASWH. 

In June 2021, he signed with VV Capelle.

References

External links
 Voetbal International profile 

1990 births
Living people
Dutch people of Turkish descent
Dutch footballers
RKC Waalwijk players
Boluspor footballers
Derde Divisie players
Eerste Divisie players
TFF First League players
Footballers from Dordrecht
Association football midfielders
ASWH players